Her Wedding Night is a 1930 American pre-Code comedy film directed by Frank Tuttle and written by Avery Hopwood and Henry Myers. The film stars Clara Bow, Ralph Forbes, Charlie Ruggles, Richard "Skeets" Gallagher, Geneva Mitchell, and Rosita Moreno. The film was released on September 18, 1930, by Paramount Pictures. Paramount remade the film at the company's Joinville Studios in Paris into several other languages including the French version Let's Get Married.

The film is a remake of the silent film Miss Bluebeard (1925), also directed by Frank Tuttle.

Cast 
Clara Bow as Norma Martin
Ralph Forbes as Larry Charters
Charlie Ruggles as Bertie Bird
Richard "Skeets" Gallagher as Bob Talmadge
Geneva Mitchell as Gloria Marshall
Rosita Moreno as Lulu
Natalie Kingston as Eva
Wilson Benge as Smithers
Lillian Elliott as Mrs. Marshall
Raoul Paoli as The Mayor
Rose Dione as Masseuse (uncredited)
Sam Savitsky as Parisian Boulevardier (uncredited)

References

External links

Stills  at the Walter Film Poster and Photo Museum

1930 films
1930s English-language films
American comedy films
1930 comedy films
Paramount Pictures films
Films directed by Frank Tuttle
American black-and-white films
Remakes of American films
Sound film remakes of silent films
1930s American films